Kouta may refer to:

 Katsutaro Kouta (1904–1974), Japanese singer
 Kouta (music), a genre of  music
 Anthony Koutoufides, Australian rules footballer

See also
 
 Kota (disambiguation)
 Kuta (disambiguation)